Federico Fernández may refer to:

 Federico Fernández (footballer) (born 1989), Argentine footballer
 Federico Fernández (equestrian) (born 1968), Mexican equestrian
 Federico Fernández Cavada (1831–1871), American Civil War officer
 Federico Gastón Fernández (born 1989), Argentine handball player